This article shows the roster of all participating teams at the 2019 FIVB Volleyball Men's Nations League. The 16 national teams involved in the tournament were required to register a squad of 21 players, which every week's 14-player roster must be selected from. Each country must declare its 14-player roster two days before the start of each week's round-robin competition.

The following is the Argentine roster in the 2019 Men's Nations League.

Head coach: Julio Velasco

The following is the Brazilian roster in the 2019 Men's Nations League.

Head coach: Renan Dal Zotto

The following is the French roster in the 2019 Men's Nations League.

Head coach: Laurent Tillie

The following is the Iranian roster in the 2019 Men's Nations League.

Head coach: Igor Kolakovic

The following is the Japanese roster in the 2019 Men's Nations League.

Head coach: Yuichi Nakagaichi

The following is the Polish roster in the 2019 Men's Nations League.

Head coach: Vital Heynen / Jakub Bednaruk

The following is the Russian roster in the 2019 Men's Nations League.

Head coach: Tuomas Sammelvuo

References

External links
FIVB Volleyball Nations League 2019 – official website

FIVB Volleyball Men's Nations League
2019
2019 in men's volleyball